Basigin (BSG) also known as extracellular matrix metalloproteinase inducer (EMMPRIN) or cluster of differentiation 147 (CD147) is a protein that in humans is encoded by the BSG gene. This protein is a determinant for the Ok blood group system. There are three known antigens in the Ok system; the most common being Oka (also called OK1), OK2 and OK3. Basigin has been shown to be an essential receptor on red blood cells for the human malaria parasite, Plasmodium falciparum. The common isoform of basigin (basigin-2) has two immunoglobulin domains, and the extended form basigin-1 has three.

Function 
Basigin is a member of the immunoglobulin superfamily, with a structure related to the putative primordial form of the family. As members of the immunoglobulin superfamily play fundamental roles in intercellular recognition involved in various immunologic phenomena, differentiation, and development, basigin is thought also to play a role in intercellular recognition (Miyauchi et al., 1991; Kanekura et al., 1991).

It has a variety of functions. In addition to its metalloproteinase-inducing ability, basigin also regulates several distinct functions, such as spermatogenesis, expression of the monocarboxylate transporter and the responsiveness of lymphocytes.
Basigin is a type I integral membrane receptor that has many ligands, including the cyclophilin (CyP) proteins Cyp-A and CyP-B and certain integrins. Basigin also serves as a receptor for S100A9 and platelet glycoprotein VI, and basigin-1 acts as a receptor for the rod-derived cone viability factor. It is expressed by many cell types, including epithelial cells, endothelial cells, neural progenitor cells and leukocytes. The human basigin protein contains 269 amino acids that form two heavily glycosylated C2 type immunoglobulin-like domains at the N-terminal extracellular portion. A second form of basigin has also been characterized that contains one additional immunoglobulin-like domain in its extracellular portion.

Interactions 
Basigin has been shown to interact with Ubiquitin C.

Basigin has been shown to form a complex with monocarboxylate transporters in the retina of mice. Basigin appears to be required for proper placement of MCTs in the membrane.  In the Basigin null mouse, the failure of MCTs to integrate with the membrane may be directly linked to a failure of nutrient transfer in the retinal pigmented epithelium (the lactates transported by MCTs 1, 3, and 4 are essential nutrients for the developing RPE), resulting in loss of sight in the null animal.

Basigin interacts with the fourth C-type lectin domain in the receptor Endo180 to form a molecular epithelial-mesenchymal transition suppressor complex that if disrupted results in the induction of invasive prostate epithelial cell behavior associated with poor prostate cancer survival.

Modulators 
It have been shown that Atorvastatin suppresses CD147 and MMP-3 expression. Statins altered CD147 expression, structure and function.

Role in malaria
It has recently (November 2011) been found that basigin is a receptor that is essential to erythrocyte invasion by most strains of Plasmodium falciparum, the most virulent species of the plasmodium parasites that cause human malaria.  It is hoped that by developing antibodies to the parasite ligand for Basigin, Rh5, a better vaccine for malaria might be found. Basigin is bound by the PfRh5 protein on the surface of the malaria parasite.

Role in SARS-CoV-2 infection (COVID-19) 
The host-cell-expressed basigin (CD147) may bind spike protein of SARS-CoV-2 and possibly be involved in host cell invasion.
Subsequently, meplazumab, a humanized anti-CD147 antibody, was tested in patients with SARS-CoV-2 pneumonia.

Some of these claims have been challenged by another group of scientists who found no evidence of a direct role for basigin in either binding the viral spike protein or promoting lung cell infection.

More recent studies suggests CD147 as SARS-CoV-2 entry receptor of platelets and megakaryocytes, leading to hyperactivation and thrombosis, that differs from common cold coronavirus CoV-OC43. Incubation of megakaryocytecells with SARS-CoV-2 resulted in a significant increase in the proinflammatory transcripts LGALS3BP and S100A9. Notably, CD147 antibody-mediated blocking significantly reduced the expression of S100A9, and S100A8 on megakaryocytes following incubation with SARS-CoV-2. These data indicate that megakaryocytes and platelets actively take up SARS-CoV-2 virions, likely via an ACE-2-independent mechanism.

Another study states that platelets challenged with SARS-CoV-2 undergo activation, dependent on the CD147 receptor. Yet SARS-CoV-2 does not replicate in human platelets.

References

Further reading

External links 

 
 Ok blood group system at BGMUT Blood Group Antigen Gene Mutation Database at NCBI, NIH
 PDBe-KB provides an overview of all the structure information available in the PDB for Human Basigin

Complement system
Clusters of differentiation
Blood
Transfusion medicine
Hematology
Blood antigen systems